Grand Ayatollah Hussein-Ali Montazeri (24 September 1922 – 19 December 2009) was an Iranian Shia Islamic theologian, Islamic democracy advocate, writer and human rights activist. He was one of the leaders of the Iranian Revolution and one of the highest-ranking authorities in Shīʿite Islam. He was once the designated successor to the revolution's Supreme Leader, Ayatollah Khomeini, but they had a falling-out in 1989 over government policies that Montazeri claimed infringed on people's freedom and denied them their rights, especially after the 1988 mass execution of political prisoners. Montazeri spent his later years in Qom and remained politically influential in Iran, but was placed in house arrest in 1997 for questioning "the unaccountable rule exercised by the supreme leader", Ali Khamenei, who succeeded Khomeini in his stead. He was known as the most knowledgeable senior Islamic scholar in Iran and a grand marja (religious authority) of Shia Islam. Ayatollah Montazeri was said to be one of Khamenei's teachers.

For more than two decades, Hussein-Ali Montazeri was one of the main critics of the Islamic Republic's domestic and foreign policy. He had also been an active advocate of Baháʼí rights, civil rights and women's rights in Iran. Montazeri was a prolific writer of books and articles. He was a staunch proponent of an Islamic state, and he argued that post-revolutionary Iran was not being ruled as an Islamic state.

Early life and public career
Born in 1922, Montazeri was from a peasant family in Najafabad, a city in Isfahan Province, 250 miles south of Tehran.

His early theological education was in Isfahan. After Khomeini was forced into exile by the Shah, Montazeri "sat at the center of the clerical network" which Khomeini had established to oppose Pahlavi rule. He became a teacher at the Faiziyeh Theological School. While there he answered Khomeini's call to protest the White Revolution of Shah Mohammad Reza Pahlavi in June 1963 and was active in anti-Shah clerical circles. He was sent to prison in 1974 and released in 1978 in time to be active during the revolution. Montazeri then went to Qom where he studied theology.

Iranian Revolution

Montazeri was known as an Islamic jurist who was made to pay for his liberal-leaning beliefs. He supported a democratic republic as the best form of government; however in his ideal model for government, an Islamic jurist acts as a supervisor and advisor, what he, along with Ayatollah Khomeini, termed as velayat-e faqih. He was the author of Dirasāt fī wilāyah al-faqīh, a scholarly book advocating the supervision of the administration by Islamic jurists. He believed in the independence of the government and did not accept any executive and policy making role for the Islamic jurist. Montazeri asserted that the rule of the jurisprudent should not be an absolute rule; instead, it should be limited to the function of advisor to the rulers, who are elected by the people.

In 1979, following the overthrow of the Shah, he played a pivotal role in instituting Iran's new constitution. He was one of the leaders of the movement to replace the democratic and secular draft constitution proposed for the Islamic Republic with one where the supervision of Islamic jurists was recognized. He distributed "a detailed commentary and alternate draft" for Iran's new constitution. It included proposals to specify that Twelver Shi'ism—and not Islam in general—was the official religion of the state and to state that Islamic jurists should appoint judges with the right of veto over all laws and actions that are against the Islamic principles. Later he served on the Assembly of Experts (Majles-e-Khobregan) that wrote the constitution and that implemented many of his proposals.

During this time, Montazeri also served as Friday prayer leader of Qom, as a member of the Revolutionary Council and as deputy to Supreme Leader Khomeini. Khomeini began "to transfer some of his power" to Montazeri, in 1980. By 1983 "all government offices hung a small picture" of Montazeri next to that of Khomeini. In 1984, Montazeri became a grand ayatollah.

Montazeri initially rejected Khomeini's proposal to make him his successor, insisting that the choice of successor be left to the democratically elected Assembly of Experts. Later, Montazeri relented, and following a session of the Assembly of Experts in November 1985, he was officially appointed Khomeini's successor as Supreme Leader.

Some observers believe Khomeini chose him for this role solely because of his support for Khomeini's principle of theocratic rule by Islamic jurists. Khomeini's proposed form of administration called for the most learned, or one of the most learned, Islamic jurists to "rule", and of all those who might be considered a leading Islamic jurist, only Montazeri supported theocracy. In Montazeri's opinion, however the jurist would not act as an absolute ruler, instead,  he would act as an advisor and consultant.

Montazeri fell short of the theological requirements of the supreme Faqih. He could not claim descent from the Prophet nor did he possess all the credentials of a revered scholar of Islamic law. His religious followers were few. And he lacked the all-important charisma. His selection had happened for one reason—he was the only one among the candidates for Faqih who totally endorsed Khomeini's vision of Islamic government.

In addition, traditionalists did not approve Montazeri's designation as successor due to several reasons, including his problematic persona in Shiite seminaries during the reign of the Shah and his support for Ali Shariati’s and for Nematollah Salehi Najaf Abadi's works. Montazeri's leadership qualifications were further hurt by not being a seyyed, or descendant of the Prophet Mohammed, traditionally wearing the black turban in Shiite Islam, like Khomeini and Khomeini's successor Supreme Leader Ayatollah Ali Khamenei. In the early years of the revolution, he was not as popular as he was in the last two decades of his life. The middle class and elites would mock him in those early years.

Dispute with Khomeini and demotion

Montazeri was one of Ayatollah Khomeini's two favorite pupils. Khomeini trusted Montazeri with important responsibilities and referred to him as "the fruit of his life". Likewise, Montazeri respected and admired Khomeini's "sheer determination and unshakable faith."

Mehdi Karrubi claims that the tensions between Montazeri and Khomeini began in around October 1986 when Montazeri sent a letter to the latter, criticising and questioning the foundation of the state. Montazeri's troubles became further evident due to his association with Mehdi Hashemi who ran an organization out of Montazeri's office which sought to export the Islamic revolution. Hashemi is thought to have embarrassed Akbar Hashemi Rafsanjani by leaking information of his connection with the Iran-Contra affair. Subsequently Hashemi was arrested, convicted and executed in September 1987 on charges of counterrevolutionary activities.

In November 1987, Montazeri created more controversy when he called for the legalization of political parties, though under strict regulation. He followed this by calling for "an open assessment of failures" of the Revolution and an end to the export of revolution, saying that Iran should inspire by example, not train and arm allied groups. Khomeini responded the next February by criticizing Montazeri and a month later called for a meeting of the Assembly of Experts to "discuss him."

Things came to a head following the mass execution of political prisoners in late summer and early autumn 1988, when Montazeri gave a series of lectures in which he indicated support for a "far more open" policy. In an interview published in Keyhan in early 1989, he criticized Khomeini in language that is said to have sealed "his political fate":
The denial of people's rights, injustice and disregard for the revolution's true values have delivered the most severe blows against the revolution. Before any reconstruction [takes place], there must first be a political and ideological reconstruction... This is something that the people expect of a leader.

Still worse for him were the publication abroad and broadcast on the BBC of his letters condemning the post-war wave of executions in March 1989. Montazeri also criticized Khomeini's fatwa ordering the assassination of author Salman Rushdie saying: "People in the world are getting the idea that our business in Iran is just murdering people."

On 26 March 1989, Khomeini strongly denounced Montazeri's actions, and two days later announced that Montazeri had resigned his post. Montazeri did not protest, issuing a message concluding, "I ask all brothers and sisters not to utter a word in my support."

In addition to losing his position as designated heir, Montazeri's title of Grand Ayatollah was withdrawn, publication of his lectures in the 
Kayhan newspaper and references to him on the state radio were stopped, his portraits were ordered by the then Prime Minister Mir Hossein Mousavi to be removed from offices and mosques, and his security guards were withdrawn. Articles and editorials appeared in various newspapers aimed at "dismantling" Montazeri's "impeccable" revolutionary credentials.

According to numerous sources, the amendment to Iran's constitution removing the requirement that the Supreme Leader be a Marja was instituted to deal with the problem of the lack of any remaining Grand Ayatollahs willing to accept "illimitable velayat-e faqih". However, others said the reason marjas were not elected was because of their lack of votes in the Assembly of Experts. For example, Grand Ayatollah Mohammad Reza Golpaygani had the backing of only thirteen members of the assembly. Furthermore, there were other marjas present who accepted "illimitable velayat-e faqih".

Later dissent and house arrest
Khomeini died in June 1989 and another cleric, Seyed Ali Khamene'i, was selected by the Assembly of Experts to be the new Supreme Leader. Khamenei had been a high-ranking Hojatoleslam before Montazeri's removal. His promotion was accepted by many Shi'a, among the exceptions being Montazeri.

In December 1989, Montazeri's supporters in Qom distributed "night letters" questioning Khamenei's qualifications to be a Marja e Taqlid ("Source of Emulation"), or in other words, an Ayatollah. In retaliation Revolutionary Guards "detained and humiliated" Montazeri, "forcing him to wear his nightcap rather than his white turban."

In October 1997, after openly criticizing the authority of Khamenei, Montazeri was placed under house arrest under the pretext of protecting him from hardliners. He was freed from house arrest in 2003 after more than 100 Iranian legislators called on President Khatami to free him. Some thought that the government lifted the house arrest to avoid the possibility of a popular backlash if the ailing Montazeri died while in custody.

Criticism of the government
During the 1988 executions of Iranian political prisoners, Montazeri wrote to Khomeini saying "at least order to spare women who have children ... the execution of several thousand prisoners in a few days will not reflect positively and will not be mistake-free ... A large number of prisoners have been killed under torture by interrogators ... in some prisons of the Islamic Republic young girls are being raped ... As a result of unruly torture, many prisoners have become deaf or paralysed or afflicted with chronic disease."

On 22 January 2007, Montazeri criticized former Iranian President Mahmoud Ahmadinejad for his nuclear and economic policies.

While agreeing Iran had the right to develop nuclear energy, he called Ahmadinejad's approach to the issue aggressive, saying, "One has to deal with the enemy with wisdom, not provoke it, ... his (provocation) only creates problems for the country" and asked, "Don't we have other rights too?", referring to individual and human rights. Montazeri also criticized the economic performance of Ahmadinejad's administration's, noting the rate of inflation—including a 50% increase in housing costs—arguing that a country cannot be run on "slogans".

Montazeri, in a 2008 interview with Voice of America concerning the 29th anniversary of the revolution, stated that the revolution had given Islam a bad name, arguing "Unfortunately, it is only by name that the revolution remains Islamic. Its content has changed, and what is taking place in the name of Islam gives a bad image of the religion. This is the religion of kindness and tolerance." He also issued a statement in 2008 in support of the rights of the persecuted Baháʼís in the Islamic Republic, saying that though Baháʼís were not People of the Book like Jews, Christians and Zoroastrians, nonetheless:  "they are the citizens of this country, they have the right of citizenship and to live in this country. Furthermore, they must benefit from the Islamic compassion which is stressed in Quran and by the religious authorities."

Montazeri again spoke out against Ahmadinejad on 16 June 2009 during the protests against his reelection. Ahmadinejad was controversially reelected as president after a closely contested and disputed election, which involved many candidates, but whose leading vote-getters were Ahmadinejad and former Prime Minister Mir Hossein Mousavi. The government reported that Ahmadinejad had won the election with 62 percent of the vote. Montazeri stated that "No one in their right mind can believe" the results were fairly counted.  Montazeri called for three days of public mourning for the death of Neda Agha-Soltan and others killed during 20 June protests. He further declared that the then current ruling government was neither Islamic nor a republic, but military. In November 2009, on the day before the 30th anniversary celebration of the Iran hostage crisis, Montazeri said that the occupation of the American embassy in 1979 had been a mistake.

Human rights and gender
While Ayatollah Montazeri has been celebrated as a champion of the rights of political prisoners, and human rights associated with the public sphere, in an interview  conducted in 2003 in Qom with the Iranian feminist academic Golbarg Bashi he said that while men and women enjoy the same dignity and respect in the eyes of God, women's rights must remain strictly under the domain of Shi'i fiqh rather than international human rights conventions such as CEDAW.

In response to Golbarg Bashi, Ayatollah Montazeri said:

When Bashi informed him that currently (2003) in Iranian universities, "some 60% of students are women" and asked him "so in future generations, when the number of professors, physicians, high-ranking experts, etc, will be mostly women, will Islam be able to have an ijtihad and modify these unjust laws because they no longer correspond with reality?"

Ayatollah Montazeri responded: "Those aspects of the Islamic law that are based on the very letter of the Qur'an, the answer is no. But certain other things yes, you can, and they can be subject to changing times. But those that are from the very letter of the Qur'an, no they cannot, and those have certain wisdom and subtleties in them."

Reputation
According to journalist Christopher de Bellaigue, Montazeri was regarded as "brilliant" by his allies, and even his opponents; de Bellaigue added that Montazeri "lives plainly, and equates Islam with social justice". Montazeri's detractors portrayed him as stubborn and naïve in his insistence that the Islamic republic find reconciliation with the "hypocrites" and "liberals" who are its "internal enemies."

Public image
In late 1960s, Montazeri gained influence and popularity in Isfahan Province after his speeches criticizing the Shah, moving SAVAK to banish and subsequently imprison him.

In 1980s, Montazeri was known by the pejorative nickname Gorbeh Nareh (the masculine cat) after the Cat, a character in the Pinocchio animated series. According to Elaine Sciolino, this was due to his "poor public speaking skills, squeaky voice, round face and grizzled beard".

Personal life
On 4 September 1942, he married Mah-Sultan Rabbani (1926 – 26 March 2010) and had seven children, four daughters and three sons. One of his sons, Mohammad Montazeri, died in a bomb blast at Islamic Republican Party headquarters in 1981 which was carried out by the People's Mujahedin of Iran; another, Saeed Montazeri, lost an eye in the Iran-Iraq war in 1985. Another son, Ahmad Montazeri, is a cleric in Qom; during the 1970s Ahmad underwent military training in Fatah camps in Lebanon. The brother of Montazeri's son-in-law, Mehdi Hashemi, was sentenced to death and executed after the 1979 revolution due to his alleged involvement in the murder of Ayatollah Abul Hassan Shams Abadi, who had been a critic of Montazeri, in Isfahan.

He was described by Ayatollah Mohammad Guilani as "meticulous about, if not obsessed by, cleanliness."

Death

On 19 December 2009, Montazeri died in his sleep of heart failure at his home in Qom, at the age of 87. The Islamic Republic News Agency, the official news agency of Iran, did not use the Ayatollah title in its initial reports of his death and referred to him as the "clerical figure of rioters". The state television and radio broadcasters were similar, showing the tension between the government and its opponents.

Funeral and protests

Montazeri's funeral was said to have marked "a new phase" in Iran's 2009 uprising.

21 December

On 21 December, hundreds of thousands of mourners and the Green Movement supporters from across Iran turned out in Montazeri's funeral and turned the funeral to a massive protest against the Iranian government. The funeral service for him began at his house and funeral prayers were held at the Grand Mosque in Qom. After the special prayers by Ayatollah Mousa Shabiri Zanjani, his body was laid to rest in the Fatima Masumeh Shrine. He was buried alongside his son, Mohammad Montazeri.

The protesters chanted opposition slogans, including "Our shame, our shame, our idiot leader", and “Dictator, this is your last message: the people of Iran are rising!”

Although the police mostly stayed clear of the funeral, there were some skirmishes between protesters and the Basij militia. Also on 21 December, inside the Qom shrine where Montazeri’s body was laid to rest, opposition activists gathered and chanted “Death to the dictator.” When one group of pro-government basiji militiamen came toward them, chanting “Death to the hypocrites,” the crowd changed to an anti-basiji slogan. Then they took out money, offering it to the basiji, and chanted that they were acting as paid mercenaries of the government: “Where is the oil money? Spent on the Basiji,” and “Basij’s great pride, rape in prison.” On the same day, Mir-Hossein Mousavi stepped out from the compound of Grand Ayatollah Saanei, a fellow reformist, to cross the street to Montazeri’s house in Qom. At that moment, a group of 30 bearded men, holding Montazeri pictures to blend into the crowd, dropped the portraits, started attacking Mousavi and shouted “death to the hypocrite.” The former candidate had to be hustled quickly into the Montazeri compound. The same thing happened when cleric Mehdi Karroubi stepped into the street. This time, groups of reformists were ready and pushed back the vigilantes, so that Karroubi could pass.

As the funeral procession ended, security forces poured into the city, blocking roads to the Ayatollah's house and tearing down posters of the Ayatollah. Mourners were reported to have thrown stones at police who tried to stop them chanting pro-Montazeri slogans. Mourners responded defiantly when ordered by loudspeaker not to chant, breaking into shouts of "Ya Hossein, Mir Hossein" in support of Mir Hossein Mousavi. When a crowd of pro-government supporters chanted back: "I will give my life for the supreme leader," they were booed by mourners, a witness said. The security forces prevented the Ayatollah's family from holding a planned memorial ceremony in the grand mosque of Qom following the funeral.

According to the reformist website Kalameh, men on motorbikes, believed to be Ahmadinejad supporters, attacked the car carrying Mir Hossein Mousavi back from Qom to Tehran. They insulted Mousavi, smashed the back window and injured one of his aides.

There were also protests in Najafabad, birthplace of Ayatollah Montazeri. Internet videos showed protesters waving green banners and chanting, “Dictator, dictator, Montazeri is alive!” and “Oh Montazeri, your path will be followed even if the dictator shoots us all!”

22 and 23 December
On 22 December, Ahmadinejad continued his quest to strip his opponents of their last vestiges of political power. He interrupted a visit to Shiraz to return to Tehran and remove Mir Hossein Mousavi, the main opposition leader he defeated in the presidential election, as head of the state Academy of Arts and Culture- a post he had held for ten years. Hardliners also want Mousavi arrested for his role in inciting unrest since the disputed June election.

On 23 December, Iranian security forces clashed with tens of thousands of opposition supporters in the city of Isfahan, according to opposition website reports. Activists said police used tear gas, pepper spray and batons to disperse people gathering to commemorate Grand Ayatollah Montazeri in the Seyed mosque. People had gathered at the main mosque for the memorial service, but when they arrived the doors were closed and security forces told them to leave. Afterwards, security forces began beating people, including women and children with batons, chains and stones, used tear gas and pepper spray and arrested at least 50 people, including four journalists and a cleric, Masoud Abid, who was to deliver the sermon. Many were also injured. One witness said, "They took people in the shops and beat them up mostly out of public vision although some beatings happened outside on the streets." Security forces also sealed off the home of Ayatollah Jalal Al-Din Taheri, who organised the service and used to lead Friday prayers in Isfahan until he resigned in 2002 in protest at the government’s growing authoritarianism.

Meanwhile, footage sent to the BBC from Najafabad showed crowds chanting "Criminals, rapists, death to the leadership" and "We're not afraid, we're not afraid" as security men watched from rooftops.

Police severely attacked mourners and protesters in several cities, with many wounded and arrested. The government also announced that banknotes with anti-government annotation, which recently spread across the country, will be forbidden starting from 8 January.

24 December
On 24 December, opposition web sites reported that police in Tehran and the northwestern city of Zanjan clashed with protesters defying an order by the Iranian government banning memorial services for Montazeri. Protesters marched in Imam Khomeini Square in southern Tehran in a sign of mourning for Montazeri. The protesters chanted, "Today is a mourning day; the green nation of Iran is mourning today"—a reference to the trademark color of the opposition. The police attacked the protesters with clubs and tear gas. Older women tried to prevent the arrest of young men by throwing themselves on them, and were severely beaten by officers who intended to drag the young men away.

Meanwhile, the police in Zanjan, a city of mostly Turkish speakers, tried to prevent a mourning ceremony for Montazeri by locking the mosque where the ceremony was to be held and attacking mourners who chanted outside it. It was mentioned that: “The police beat people with such violence that many suffered from broken legs, arms and noses.” There were also many arrests.

26 December
Witnesses and opposition websites reported the following incidents:
There were protests in several areas of the capital, including the poorer areas of south Tehran, and government forces were using tear gas to try to disperse demonstrators.
Clashes were reported in northern Tehran near Jamaran mosque (where Khomeini used to address people), between thousands of opposition supporters (who shouted anti-government slogans) and riot police. Reformist ex-President Mohammad Khatami had been due to speak at the mosque to mark the Shiite holy day of Ashura. However, security officials cancelled the Ashura speech to be given by Khatami and also surrounded the mosque. A reformist website reported about 50 plainclothes forces breaking into Jamaran mosque and attacking people. Riot police also fired tear gas during the incident. Protesters shouted, "death to this dictatorship" and "if Khomeini was alive, he would sure be with us," according to witnesses. A witness also said, "Police told them they have five minutes to leave and, when they were still shouting slogans and persisted, policemen on motorbikes drove through the crowds and fired teargas." Riot police and members of the Basij also chased demonstrators into the nearby bustling Niavaran street and fired paintballs at them. The security forces also arrested several protesters. Clashes were also reported between police and protesters near another north Tehran mosque, Dar al-Zahra, which is known to host reformist clerics.
Opposition supporters had gathered in groups along a stretch of a main Tehran city centre route several kilometres long, but police were out in force and were not letting them join each other. Earlier, there were clashes at several points along Enghelab Street, a main thoroughfare where months earlier hundreds of thousands of opposition supporters had staged protest marches after Ahmadinejad's disputed re-election. Police also stopped and arrested the passengers of a bus near Enghelab Square because they were chanting pro-opposition slogans. Some protesters were reported to have chanted: "The dictator must know that he will soon be overthrown."
Tension was running high at rallies in which protesters were chanting anti-government slogans in three areas of central Tehran. Government forces, including soldiers of the elite Revolutionary Guard and the paramilitary Basiji, are said to have reacted aggressively—beating protesters with batons, firing warning shots into the air to disperse demonstrators, using teargas and pepper spray and smashing the windscreens of cars that were hooting in protest, as well as making numerous arrests.
Security forces chased protesters into a building housing the offices of the ISNA news agency, where some demonstrators had sought shelter during the clashes, ISNA said, adding one of its reporters had been injured when security forces had attacked the building. An eyewitness said at least two people were injured when police chased after protesters into the building. “They fractured the skull of one ISNA person and badly beat up another employee,” the witness said. ISNA's news service appeared to be working normally and it later issued a report on the incident, saying one of its reporters had been injured without specifying who was to blame.
An elderly woman travelling on a city bus in the area was heard urging passengers to chant slogans such as "Ya Hossein, Mir Hossein" in support of opposition leader Mir Hossein Mousavi, a witness said. The witness said passengers on the packed bus also chanted "Our Neda is not dead, it is the government which is dead," referring to protester Neda Agha Soltan, who bled to death during a 20 June protest in shocking scenes caught on video and viewed by millions around the world.
Witnesses said riot police fired warning shots in several areas of Tehran to deter demonstrators, many of whom chanted slogans increasingly against the country's supreme leader, Ayatollah Ali Khamenei, Iran's most powerful figure, rather than President Mahmoud Ahmadinejad.
Clashes were reported in cities including Isfahan, Kermanshah and Shiraz, as opposition supporters used the Tasua and Ashura ceremonies to take to the streets.

Later events
In 2010, the office of Montazeri that had been run by his son Ahmad was closed on the orders of Ali Khamenei.

See also 
 Ruhollah Khomeini
 Seyed Reza Bahaadini

References

Further reading

External links

 Office of Ayatollah Montazeri, Qom
 "Leadership & legitimacy: The controversy among the clergy over who should lead the Islamic state"—The Iranian
 "Iran's fatwa for freedom"—Washington Times
 Grand Ayatollah Montazeri: "The System Has No Religious Merit"
 "The Good Ayatollah" by Prof. Abbas Milani, Foreign Policy

1922 births
2009 deaths
Iranian democracy activists
Iranian dissidents
Iranian grand ayatollahs
Iranian religious leaders
Iranian revolutionaries
Iranian writers
Islamic democracy activists
Muslim reformers
People from Najafabad
People of the Iranian Revolution
Society of Seminary Teachers of Qom members
Speakers of the Assembly of Experts
People who have been placed under house arrest in Iran
Members of the Assembly of Experts for Constitution
Inmates of Evin Prison
20th-century Iranian philosophers
Burials at Fatima Masumeh Shrine